APEC Australia 1989 was composed of a series of political meetings held around Australia between the 12 member economies of the Asia-Pacific Economic Cooperation. These meetings were the first of a series of meetings and were held between 5 and 7 November 1989 in Canberra, the capital of Australia.

Leader

References 

1989 in Australia
Diplomatic conferences in Australia
20th-century diplomatic conferences
1989 conferences
1989 in international relations
1980s in Canberra
1989
November 1989 events in Australia